The 1928 Wimbledon Championships took place on the outdoor grass courts at the All England Lawn Tennis and Croquet Club in Wimbledon, London, United Kingdom. The tournament was held from Monday 25 June until Saturday 7 July 1928. It was the 48th staging of the Wimbledon Championships, and the third Grand Slam tennis event of 1928. René Lacoste and Helen Wills won the singles titles.

Champions

Men's singles

 René Lacoste defeated  Henri Cochet, 6–1, 4–6, 6–4, 6–2

Women's singles

 Helen Wills defeated  Lilí de Álvarez, 6–2, 6–3

Men's doubles

 Jacques Brugnon /  Henri Cochet defeated  John Hawkes /  Gerald Patterson, 13–11, 6–4, 6–4

Women's doubles

 Peggy Saunders /  Phoebe Watson defeated  Eileen Bennett /  Ermyntrude Harvey, 6–2, 6–3

Mixed doubles

 Pat Spence /  Elizabeth Ryan defeated  Jack Crawford /  Daphne Akhurst, 7–5, 6–4

References

External links
 Official Wimbledon Championships website

 
Wimbledon Championships
Wimbledon Championships
Wimbledon Championships
Wimbledon Championships